Mwebesa is a surname of African origin.

People with the surname 

 Christine Ntegamahe Mwebesa, Ugandan medical doctor and former Member of Parliament
 Francis Mwebesa, Ugandan government minister

See also 

Surnames by culture
Surnames of Ugandan origin